The 1944 United States presidential election in Georgia took place on November 7, 1944, as part of the wider United States presidential election. Voters chose 12 representatives, or electors, to the Electoral College, who voted for president and vice president.

Background and vote
With the exception of a handful of historically Unionist North Georgia counties – chiefly Fannin but also to a lesser extent Pickens, Gilmer and Towns – Georgia since the 1880s had been a one-party state dominated by the Democratic Party. Disfranchisement of almost all African-Americans and most poor whites had made the Republican Party virtually nonexistent outside of local governments in those few hill counties, and the national Democratic Party served as the guardian of white supremacy against a Republican Party historically associated with memories of Reconstruction. The only competitive elections were Democratic primaries, which state laws restricted to whites on the grounds of the Democratic Party being legally a private club.

1944 saw the beginning of the breakdown of this single-party political system when the Supreme Court in Smith v. Allwright ruled against the white primary system. During the period between Smith and the 1944 election, further challenges from blacks occurred after the state announced that coming primaries would remain all-white. Despite some opposition amongst the Southern ruling elite to Roosevelt – mitigated by the replacement of Henry A. Wallace as Vice-Presidential nominee – the incumbent President again overwhelmingly carried the state, losing only 3 percent on his 1940 vote share.

Georgia had lowered its voting age from twenty-one to eighteen in 1943.

Results

Results by county

Notes

References

Georgia
1944
1944 Georgia (U.S. state) elections